The John & Jeff Show was an American radio show hosted by John Boyle and Jeff Carroll that aired on KLSX-FM in Los Angeles from 1999 to 2012. They were two guys with similar opinions on various controversial topics. John & Jeff also streamed the show live from their website, www.johnjeff.com. The show was syndicated by Fisher Entertainment. They were most famous for being featured on the infamous Opie and Anthony segment "Jocktober". Talkers Magazine has named John & Jeff to their list of Heavy 100 talk show hosts on numerous occasions.  As of April 2012, the John and Jeff show ended its national syndication after over a decade on the air.

Final Broadcast on 97.1 KLSX-FM
On the night of February 19, 2009, the John and Jeff Show aired its final broadcast on its flagship station, 97.1 KLSX due to the format change to top 40 music that would occur the following day at 5:00PM PST. Although dropped from its home station of over ten years, the show continues in national syndication on about twenty radio stations across the country; however, Los Angeles listeners would only be able to listen to the show online at johnjeff.com. Their final show on KLSX was broadcast locally and the hosts thanked the listeners for their support and encouraged them to continue listening online beginning February 22. On September 8, 2009, the John and Jeff Show moved its syndication to CRN Digital Talk Radio Networks; as of early 2011 the show was syndicated by Fisher Entertainment and the Genesis Communications Network until it ended its run in April 2012.

Post-Syndication
Although no official reason was given for the show's ending, John and Jeff continue to occasionally fill-in for various talk stations throughout the country, most frequently on KABC-AM in Los Angeles. However, the "John and Jeff Show" moniker is never mentioned.

John also hosts a weekly radio infomercial called Power Trading Radio, sponsored by a stock trading seminar, heard throughout Southern California.

References

External links
John & Jeff website
John & Jeff Facebook Page
John & Jeff's Myspace Official Group

American talk radio programs